Brayan Andrés Ceballos Jiménez (born 24 May 2001) is a Colombian footballer who plays as central defender for Campeonato Brasileiro Série A club Fortaleza.

Club career

Early career
Born in Cali, Ceballos was an Universitario Popayán youth graduate, and made his senior debut on 11 April 2018, starting in a 1–0 away win over Deportes Quindío, for the year's Copa Colombia. After five more Categoría Primera B appearances, he moved to the latter club, owned by the same group of businessmen.

Initially a backup option, Ceballos became a regular starter for the club in the 2021 season, helping in their promotion to the Categoría Primera A in the Torneo I. He made his top tier debut on 17 July 2021, playing the full 90 minutes in a 2–0 home success over Jaguares de Córdoba.

Ceballos scored his first senior goal on 17 August 2021, netting the opener in a 2–3 home loss against Atlético Bucaramanga. He featured in 11 matches in the main category, as his side was immediately relegated back.

Fortaleza
On 16 December 2021, Ceballos moved abroad and signed a three-year contract with Campeonato Brasileiro Série A side Fortaleza.

Career statistics

Honours
Fortaleza
Copa do Nordeste: 2022
Campeonato Cearense: 2022

References

2001 births
Living people
Sportspeople from Cali
Colombian footballers
Association football defenders
Categoría Primera A players
Categoría Primera B players
Campeonato Brasileiro Série A players
Universitario Popayán footballers
Deportes Quindío footballers
Fortaleza Esporte Clube players
Colombian expatriate footballers
Colombian expatriate sportspeople in Brazil
Expatriate footballers in Brazil
21st-century Colombian people